Filtvet is a small village along the Oslofjord in Asker municipality, Viken county, Norway.

Location
Filtvet is  a 45-minute journey to Oslo by car and has become a popular tourist destination during summer. Accommodation consist principally of camping sites.

Filtvet lighthouse (Filtvet fyr) is on the west side of Oslofjord at the entrance to Oslo. The lighthouse was deserted in 1985 and a beacon placed in front of the lighthouse has since replaced the lighthouse.

Filtvet Church
Filtvet Church (Filtvet kirke) dates from 1894. The church was built of timber and has 200 seats. Both the property and timber for construction of the church were given to the local inhabitants by ship owner C. A. Jørgensen. The church was designed by architect, Alfred Christian Dahl (1857-1940). Filtvet Church was the first church project for Dahl who went on to  distinguished himself as a church architect.

Notable residents
Ingrid Berntsen - Norwegian freestyle skier
Hedda Berntsen  -  Norwegian skier
Roger Ryberg - Norwegian politician for the Labour Party.

References

Villages in Viken (county)
Villages in Buskerud
Villages in Asker
Villages in Hurum
Hurum